David Zé (23 August 1944 — 27 May 1977) was an Angolan musician, composer and activist.  He began his singing career while Angola was still under the rule of the Portuguese Empire and his music often expressed left-wing and anti-colonialist sentiments. David Zé, along with Artur Nunes, Urbano de Castro and others, was a part of a group of musicians called the FAPLA-Povo Alliance who had the role to spread and divulge awareness to Angolan citizens to start a movement of revolution. After Angolan War of Independence in 1975, he was given the official position of Director of Music in the incoming MPLA regime.

His career only lasted for about a decade, but he established himself as one of the biggest name in the "Golden Age" of Angolan music of the early 1970s. He was kidnapped and later assassinated by a group of people who dissolved from the MPLA during or after a failed attempt at a coup that took place in the 27th of May of 1977 and his music was banned from radio for more than a decade. But now he is relived and cherished as a public figure, a role model, an example to society, never to be forgotten.

Early and personal life 
He was born David Gabriel José Ferreira on August 23, 1944, in Quifangondo, Luanda Province. He was the son of Gabriel José Ferreira and Carolina José Afonso, both choristers of the Methodist Church. He attended primary and secondary education in the province of Cuanza Norte. For a while he worked at a foundry in Hoji Ya Henda.

In November 1976 he married Maria Trindade, while on military duty in São Tomé and Príncipe. He had four children, Miguel Gabriel Ferreira, Maria Carolina David Ferreira, Deolinda David Gabriel Ferreira and David Gabriel José Ferreira.

Career 
In 1966, David Zé met the singer Urbano de Castro, who convinced him to pursue a musical career. His first record, released that same year, was "Kadica Zé".

Along with de Castro and Artur Nunes he formed a trio of the most popular singers of the early 1970s, a period which is described by music historians as the "golden era" of Angolan music. Their music was central to the new cultural and nationalistic sense of identity which developed in Angola at the time, making them targets of the Portuguese authorities. They were known for politically charged music which were a mixture of Semba, Merengue, Rumba and Bolero.

His 1975 abum "Mutudi Ua Ufolo/Viúva Da Liberdade", released in the year of Angola's independence, is considered his most celebrated work and among the most iconic albums from that era.

After Angola obtained independence, David Zé enjoyed great appreciation from the newly installed president Agostinho Neto, who commissioned him to attend the independence celebrations of Mozambique, São Tomé and Príncipe and Guinea-Bissau, where he performed the song "Quem Matou Cabral". He was the coordinator of the musical group Aliança Fapla-Povo, who accompanied Neto on all his tours, whether home or abroad, and was meant as a sort of itinerant embassy of Angolan culture.

Death 
On 27 May 1977, Nito Alves, a hardline member of the MPLA and leader of the Fractionist group, launched a failed coup against Agostinho Neto, which lead to a wave of reprisals that left thousand dead. Zé, alongside fellow musicians de Castro and Nunes were among those killed, but no official account of their death exists.

David Zé was seen as a supporter of Neto, which he made abundantly clear in his lyrics, so the reasons for which he was singled out by the regime remain unclear. According to some sources, he was a member of the coup or at the very least, sympathetic towards it, while historian Marissa J. Moorman maintains that the popularity of MPLA's musicians began to eclipse that of its leaders, who were beginning to be seen increasingly as out of touch, and that worried the authorities enough to eliminate them.

Legacy 
After his death, David Zé's music was unofficially banned from radio and remained banned for more than a decade after his death. The clampdown on free speech and cultural activities that followed the coup, as well as the demise of the Companhia De Discos De Angola record label, which released much of Zé's music, further contributed to the erasure of his legacy.

After the end of the Angolan Civil War, a renewed interest in Zé's music developed. In 2001, an annual festival called "Super Caldo do Poeira" was established to celebrate the music of David Zé and other early pioneers of semba music. In 2004, a double CD edited by Rádio Nacional de Angola and titled Memorias de David Zé was released, collecting a substantial part of the singer's work.

The song "Friends" by Nas and Damian Marley samples 'Undenge Uami', which appears on Mutudi Ua Ufolo.

Discography

Albums 

 Mutudi Ua Ufolo (1975)

Single and EPs 

 Sofredora/Kadika Zé (1966)
 Fuma / Rumba Nza Tukine (1973)
 Candinha/Namorada do Conjunto (1974)
 Malalanza/Kalumba Yo (1974)
 Maria Rasgadora / Merengue S. António (1974)
 Lamento de Paiva/Tuloya Vizinho (1974)
 Jingondo/Kalunga Nguma(1974)
 Lamento de Angélica/Monami Nvunji (1974)
 Dilangue(1974)
 Kuala Kituxi/Uma Amiga (1975)
 O Guerrilheiro/Kibela (1975)
 1º De Agosto (1976)

Compilations 

 Memorias de David Zé (2004)
 Angola Anos d'Ouro : Reviver David Zé (2005)
 O Melhor de David Zé (2019)

References 

1944 births
1977 deaths
20th-century Angolan male singers
People of the Angolan Civil War
People from Luanda Province